Tang-e Daf may refer to:
 Tang-e Daf, Hormozgan
 Tang-e Daf, Sistan and Baluchestan